Dawodu is a Nigerian surname meaning "first or eldest son, and is used in the sense of heir. The royal first-born son, born after his father's succession to the throne..."

People named Dawodu
 Segun Toyin Dawodu, physician and academic

References

Surnames